"Collision Course" is the thirteenth episode of the first series of Space: 1999.  The screenplay was written by Anthony Terpiloff; the director was Ray Austin.  The final shooting script is dated 13 August 1974.  Live-action filming took place Tuesday 27 August 1974 through Tuesday 10 September 1974.

Story 
A large asteroid hurtles through space on collision course with the Moon.  As Moonbase Alpha is located within the impact area, the staff formulates a plan to avert disaster.  To guarantee the asteroid's destruction, twelve nuclear charges will be planted at strategic locations.  The Eagle task force delivers eleven charges.  However, due to a malfunction of Eagle One, Alan Carter fails to deliver the twelfth charge within the original timeline.

The charges are detonated as first Carter's Eagle, then the Moon, are engulfed in a debris cloud billowing outwards from the volatilised asteroid.  Radiation interference blots out communications and scanners.  The staff compiles damage reports and monitors the functioning of the protective radiation screens. John Koenig repeatedly tries to contact Eagle One, refusing to believe Carter is dead.  When discovering that signals transmitted on the interstellar frequency can penetrate the radiation field, he reckons that three-way contact could be established between Moonbase, a rescue Eagle equipped with a more powerful transmitter, and Carter.

Paul Morrow voices the danger of the pilots' potential exposure to radiation.  Koenig disagrees, feeling the Eagles' radiation screens are sufficient.  Victor Bergman stresses there is an unknown class of radiation present in the cloud against which they may have no defence.  The Commander disregards his advice and lifts-off in Rescue Eagle Four, with Morrow as co-pilot, flying blind through the plasma cloud, sending out hails.

Though unconscious and unable to hear Morrow's signal, Carter stirs at the whisper of a woman's voice.  She instructs him to answer his friend, which he does while unconscious. When trying to determine Carter's position, the same disembodied voice whispers coordinates in Koenig's ear.  Watched by a puzzled Morrow, the Commander programmes a course without computer assistance.  They soon find Eagle One drifting beyond the boundary of the cloud.

They move in and dock, Carter's mysterious benefactor urging him to perform all necessary actions on his end.  She then takes her leave, assuring him she is a friend.  When Koenig boards the ship, he finds Carter insensate.  He is stunned by what he sees through the forward ports, a huge planet that has appeared out of nowhere and bearing down on the Moon.

Facing another collision, they make their way back to Alpha with Carter. As Carter is conveyed to Medical, Koenig rushes to Main Mission with the data from his on-board computer.  After a quick analysis, David Kano reports the planet will impact with the Moon in 105 hours.

Bergman proposes exploding a series of nuclear charges between the Moon and the planet to create a shock wave powerful enough to force the two bodies apart.  With no other options, Koenig orders him to start planning the operation.  An in-depth analysis of the planet reveals it is marginally habitable and could support life.  Should 'Operation Shockwave' fail, the Alphans could evacuate to the far side of the planet—if it withstands the collision.  With sensors still scrambled by the radioactive cloud, Koenig opts for a reconnaissance flight.

In the Medical Centre, Carter awakens to see a mysterious figure cloaked in black, standing at the foot of his bed.  Speaking with the voice he heard earlier, the woman assures him he is safe.  He lifts her veil...only to find his hands raising Helena Russell's hair.  Koenig enters the care unit as Carter desperately searches for the apparition.  After struggling with the nurses, he is sedated.  Helena is certain the hallucinations are symptomatic of radiation sickness. Koenig dismisses her concerns and lifts off alone in the reconnaissance Eagle as a giant spaceship rises to intercept and swallow Eagle Four.

Koenig is left alone in the dark as the ship's hatches spontaneously open. The Eagle hatch closes behind him, and he enters a vast chamber draped with cobwebs.  He arrives at a throne on which is seated a mysterious figure. Her veil is raised to reveal the wizened yet still beautiful face of an ancient woman. She introduces herself as Arra, Queen of Atheria—the planet whose course has terrified the Alphans.

She announces she has been anticipating this encounter for millions of years. Koenig is confounded when informed the Moon being blasted out of orbit was no random accident.  Their worlds have been destined to meet in the body of time for the purpose of mutation.  The collision will act as a catalyst, allowing her people to evolve into a noncorporeal form of existence.  To achieve this, she asks the Alphans do...nothing.

The Moon will continue on, Arra tells Koenig, spreading humanity throughout the deepest reaches of space.  She pauses, sensing the thoughts of Bergman and company as they finalise plans for Operation Shockwave.  Three cargo Eagles are dispatched with nuclear charges, which must be deployed in space at the exact position now occupied by the Atherian vessel.  She tells Koenig that nothing must be done to interfere with this sacred event.

Though Koenig has complete faith in the aged monarch, he begs Arra to return with him.  She refuses as she has much to do to prepare for the coming transmutation.

Its power restored, Eagle Four is released from the alien ship.  As it departs, Koenig contacts Alpha, ordering Operation Shockwave suspended.  At a command conference, the Commander relates his encounter with Arra.  With the Moon emerging from the plasma cloud, readings confirm collision with Atheria in seven hours.  The senior staff is flabbergasted by his intention to do nothing.  However, Helena and Bergman support Koenig, citing his case is based on faith.  If Arra has convinced Koenig, they should place their faith in him.  Koenig confirms Shockwave is cancelled.

After the meeting adjourns, Helena and Bergman reveal they were merely humouring the Commander. The doctor confines Koenig to his quarters under sedation.  Morrow is directed to assume command and proceed with Shockwave.  Sensing their treachery, Arra reaches out to Koenig. Roused from a drugged sleep, he overwhelms the sentries stationed outside his quarters and escapes.  Arming himself, he meets up with Carter, also called into action by Arra.

They make their way to Main Mission where, at minus three minutes to detonation.  After storming the room, Koenig orders Computer to seal all entrances.  The two men herd everyone away from the detonation switch.  Koenig tries to convince the hostages that the collision will not result in destruction, but in the evolution of the Atherians to a higher form of life.  His desperation only reinforces everyone's belief he is mad.  At the risk of being shot, Morrow makes a dash for the switch.

A brawl erupts as the two worlds rush toward each other, ending with the two 'madmen' being restrained. Helena moves to detonate the charges.  Realising the countdown expired during the fight, Bergman stops her—the collision is now inevitable.  The Alphans instinctively back away from the visual of Atheria's approaching surface on the big screen.  Koenig waits for Arra...who does not appear.  Clinging to his faltering faith, he calls out for her as the floor begins heaving beneath his feet.

At the moment of contact, Atheria vanishes...the Moon ploughing through the space it occupied.  Later, Koenig broods as he stares out a window into the empty space.  He is joined by Helena, who apologises for her actions.  He interrupts, insisting she did nothing wrong.  His story was mad.  How could anyone possibly know that two planets on a collision course would not collide, but merely touch...?

Cast

Starring 
 Martin Landau — Commander John Koenig
 Barbara Bain — Doctor Helena Russell

Also Starring 
 Barry Morse — Professor Victor Bergman

Special Guest Star 
 Margaret Leighton — Arra

Featuring 
 Prentis Hancock — Controller Paul Morrow
 Clifton Jones — David Kano
 Zienia Merton — Sandra Benes
 Anton Phillips — Doctor Bob Mathias
 Nick Tate — Captain Alan Carter

Uncredited Artists 
 Suzanne Roquette — Tanya
 Sarah Bullen — Kate
 Annie Lambert — Main Mission Operative (Julie)
 Alf Joint — Alphan Man (Balcony Jumping Man)

Music 

In addition to the regular Barry Gray score (drawn primarily from "Breakaway" and "Another Time, Another Place"), music tracks composed by Gray for the previous Anderson productions Captain Scarlet and the Mysterons, Joe 90 and the film Thunderbird 6 were also utilised.

Production notes 
 Along with "Black Sun" and "War Games", "Collision Course" is considered to be one of the programme's most successful instalments by actors, crew and fans alike, exemplifying its metaphysical approach to science fiction.  Penned by American-born British television writer Anthony Terpiloff, this story would showcase the author's pet theme of the perseverance of faith and trust over logic and reason.  This approach would be seen in his subsequent contributions to the series ("Death's Other Dominion" and "Catacombs of the Moon").
 The casting of Margaret Leighton as Arra was a coup for the series.  The accomplished and prolific British actress had appeared in stage, film and television productions on both sides of the Atlantic, winning numerous awards.  Suffering from multiple sclerosis, the role of Arra was her penultimate performance (she died 13 January 1976 at the age of 53, four months after the episode was broadcast by ATV).  Production designer Keith Wilson recalls while she had no difficulty with her craft, she required direction from Ray Austin to understand her abstract and complicated dialogue.  Austin recalls her being transported to and from the set via wheelchair.  She would tell him "You'd better get this shot, because I'm not going to last long," and they ploughed through her fifteen pages of work in an unprecedented two days.
 The final shooting script contains unaired dialogue between Arra and Koenig.  Cut for time, it had Arra explaining to the Alphan that if he were to consider the Universe as a microscopic cell, his galaxy could be thought of as a single chromosome, the solar system as one gene and himself as a minuscule fragment of that gene.  This missing sequence made sense of Arra's later line that the gene of which she and her people were part would mutate.  Also lost was the end of the epilogue, where Koenig would leave Helena alone at the window.  Gazing out into space, she was to suddenly assume an enraptured expression and utter "Arra..."
 Martin Bower constructed the Atherian spaceship and nuclear charge miniatures.  Both would reappear in later spaceship graveyard sequences in "Dragon's Domain" and "The Metamorph".

Novelisation 

The episode was adapted in the fourth Year One Space: 1999 novel Collision Course by E.C. Tubb, published in 1975.  While being true to the script, Tubb would attempt to address the scientific criticism that shock waves cannot propagate through the vacuum of space.  Bergman would theorise that the atomic blast would divert the Moon and Atheria by the creation of a 'sub-etheric' shock wave; the creation of a 'sub-atomic vortex' would act on not actual particles of matter, but on the 'sub-spatial matrix' confining them.  It would be like moving bricks by moving the mortar binding them.

References

External links 
Space: 1999 - "Collision Course" - The Catacombs episode guide
Space: 1999 - "Collision Course" - Moonbase Alpha's Space: 1999 Page

1975 British television episodes
Space: 1999 episodes